New Hampton is a town in Belknap County, New Hampshire, United States. The population was 2,377 at the 2020 census. A winter sports resort area, New Hampton is home to George Duncan State Forest and to the New Hampton School, a private preparatory school established in 1821.

The primary village in town, where 373 people resided at the 2020 census, is defined as the New Hampton census-designated place, and is located along New Hampshire Route 132, just south of its intersection with Route 104.

History 

Granted in 1765 by colonial Governor Benning Wentworth, New Hampton was originally known as "Moultonborough Addition", after then-Colonel Jonathan Moulton, who held the position of town moderator. Moulton, who was born in Hampton, changed the name to New Hampton in 1777 when it was incorporated.

In 1821 the New Hampton School, a Free Will Baptist institution, was founded in the town.  From 1854 to 1870, the institute was affiliated with Cobb Divinity School (later part of Bates College).

In 1920, the New Hampton Fish Hatchery, the state's oldest fish hatchery, was established in the town.

Geography
New Hampton is bounded on the west and southwest by the Pemigewasset River. Pemigewasset Lake is in the center, and Winona Lake and Lake Waukewan are in the northeast.

The geographic center of New Hampshire is located in the eastern part of New Hampton, between Winona Lake and Jackson Pond, at 43.67925 N, 71.580375 W.

The town is served by Interstate 93 and state routes 104 and 132. I-93 serves the town at Exit 23 and leads north to Plymouth and south to Concord. NH 104 passes east–west through the town, connecting Bristol to the west with Meredith to the east.  NH 132 parallels I-93 as a local road, connecting Sanbornton and Tilton to the south with Ashland to the north.

Adjacent municipalities 
 Ashland (north)
 Center Harbor (northeast)
 Meredith (east)
 Sanbornton (south)
 Hill (southwest)
 Bristol (west)
 Bridgewater (northwest)

Demographics

As of the census of 2010, there were 2,165 people, 848 households, and 617 families residing in the town. There were 1,083 housing units, of which 235, or 21.7%, were vacant. 185 of the vacant units were for seasonal or recreational use. The racial makeup of the town was 96.9% white, 0.4% African American, 0.1% Native American, 0.8% Asian, 0.0% Native Hawaiian or Pacific Islander, 0.05% some other race, and 1.8% from two or more races. 1.1% of the population were Hispanic or Latino of any race.

Of the 848 households, 30.4% had children under the age of 18 living with them, 60.4% were headed by married couples living together, 7.5% had a female householder with no husband present, and 27.2% were non-families. 21.0% of all households were made up of individuals, and 8.2% were someone living alone who was 65 years of age or older. The average household size was 2.49, and the average family size was 2.86.

In the town, 22.5% of the population were under the age of 18, 5.2% were from 18 to 24, 25.8% from 25 to 44, 31.1% from 45 to 64, and 15.5% were 65 years of age or older. The median age was 42.4 years. For every 100 females, there were 105.0 males. For every 100 females age 18 and over, there were 102.4 males.

For the period 2011-2015, the estimated median annual income for a household was $74,009, and the median income for a family was $73,913. Male full-time workers had a median income of $49,138 versus $43,250 for females. The per capita income for the town was $28,267. 6.6% of the population and 3.3% of families were below the poverty line. 8.3% of the population under the age of 18 and 13.0% of those 65 or older were living in poverty.

Government

In the New Hampshire Senate, New Hampton is in the 2nd District, represented by Republican Bob Giuda. On the New Hampshire Executive Council, New Hampton is in the 1st District, represented by Republican Joseph Kenney. In the United States House of Representatives, New Hampton is in New Hampshire's 1st congressional district, represented by Democrat Chris Pappas.

Education
New Hampton is within the Newfound Area School District. New Hampton Community School is in New Hampton. The district's secondary schools are Newfound Memorial Middle School and Newfound Regional High School, both located in Bristol.

Sites of interest 

 Dana Meeting House
 Gordon-Nash Library
 New Hampton Town House
 New Hampton Community Church

Notable people 

 Mary W. Bacheler (1860–1939), physician; medical missionary in India
 Oliver Blake (1802–1873), businessman, Liberal member of the Senate of Canada
 Adoniram Judson Gordon (1836–1895), minister; founder and namesake of Gordon College
 Orren C. Moore (1839–1893), US congressman
 Simon W. Robinson (1792–1868), Revolutionary War era soldier, businessman
 Darius Songaila (born 1978), professional basketball player; attended New Hampton School
 Ernest Thompson (born 1949), author (On Golden Pond) (summer resident)

References

External links
 
 Gordon-Nash Library
 New Hampton Historical Society
 New Hampshire Economic and Labor Market Information Bureau Profile
 New Hampton School
 New Hampshire State Fish Hatcheries & Visitors Centers

 
Towns in Belknap County, New Hampshire
Populated places established in 1777
Towns in New Hampshire
1777 establishments in New Hampshire